Donna Guy-Halkyard ( Guy; born 1 November 1961) is a New Zealand former judoka, who won a bronze medal at the 1986 World Judo Championships, and won a silver medal at the 1990 Commonwealth Games.

Personal life
Guy-Halkyard is from Rotorua, New Zealand.

Career

At the 1986 World Judo Championships, Guy won a bronze medal in the under 61kg event. She is the only New Zealander to have won a medal at the World Judo Championships. In the same year, Guy came second at the judo demonstration event at the 1986 Commonwealth Games in Edinburgh, Scotland, losing in the final to Diane Bell. Guy also competed for New Zealand at the 1988 Summer Olympics in Seoul, South Korea. At the 1990 Commonwealth Games in Auckland, New Zealand, Guy-Halkyard came second in the under 61kg event, losing to Briton Diane Bell in the final.

Post-career
After retiring, Guy-Halkyard took up judo coaching, but retired in 1997 after a mountain biking accident. In 2014, Guy-Halkyard was the inaugural member of the Judo New Zealand Hall of Fame.

References

External links
 Judo Inside

1961 births
New Zealand female judoka
Judoka at the 1988 Summer Olympics
New Zealand sports coaches
Living people
Commonwealth Games medallists in judo
Commonwealth Games silver medallists for New Zealand
Olympic judoka of New Zealand
Judoka at the 1990 Commonwealth Games
Sportspeople from Rotorua
Medallists at the 1990 Commonwealth Games